Le Bosphore Égyptien was a French-language daily newspaper published in Egypt between 1882 and 1894. The paper is known for its opposition against the British rule in Egypt and its support for the French interests in the region. However, the political stance of the paper changed over time in favor of the British rule. It described itself as a political, literary and news publication.

History and profile
Le Bosphore Égyptien was launched in Port Said in 1882. Its founder and editor was a lawyer, Octave Borelli, and its directors were Giraud and Emile Barrière. The headquarters of the paper was moved to Cairo, and it began to be published daily. 

Arthur Rimbaud published articles about his visit to Africa in the paper. Another contributor was James O’Kelly, an Irish journalist and politician. O’Kelly advocated the nationalist Irish-Egyptian interests in his writings. Through its links to O’Kelly the paper became one of the media outlets which were often quoted by the Irish press. In turn, Le Bosphore Égyptien frequently made references to the Irish resistance to British rule to provide a model for the resistance to British rule in Egypt.

Le Bosphore Égyptien was subject to temporary bans due to its pro-French and anti-British stance. For instance, it was closed by the authorities in April 1885. Later it began to support the British rule in Egypt and welcomed the appointment of Eldon Gorst as councillor in the Ministry of Interior in 1994. The same year Le Bosphore Égyptien stopped publication.

References

1882 establishments in Egypt
1894 disestablishments in Egypt
Censorship in Egypt
Daily newspapers published in Egypt
Defunct newspapers published in Egypt
French-language newspapers published in Egypt
Newspapers published in Cairo
Publications established in 1882
Publications disestablished in 1894